Moritz Mordechai Duschak (November 14, 1815 – July 21, 1890) was an Austrian rabbi and author.

Biography
Moritz Duschak was born in Triesch, Moravia, on November 14, 1815. At the age of thirteen he went to Trebitsch, where he studied under Joachim Pollak. He was later a pupil in Talmud of Moses Sofer of Presburg, and studied at the University of Prague.

Duschak was for a long time rabbi in the Moravian towns of Aussee and Gaya. In 1877 he became preacher in Cracow and teacher of religion at the gymnasium of that city. After several years' service he left Cracow and settled in Vienna, where he spent his last days in neglect.

Publications

 
 
  On Josephus and tradition.
 
 
 
 
 
 
 
 
  Commentary on the Mishnah, treatise Mo'ed.
  Against the blood libel.

References
 

1815 births
1890 deaths
19th-century biographers
19th-century German male writers
Austrian biographers
Austrian Empire Jews
Charles University alumni
Jewish Austrian writers
Jewish Czech writers
Moravian rabbis
People from Třešť